KGTC-LP (93.1 FM, "KGTC 93.1 FM") is a radio station broadcasting a religious format. Licensed to Oroville, Washington, United States, the station is currently owned by Ruth's House of Hope.

References

External links
 
 

GTC-LP
GTC-LP
Radio stations established in 2007
2007 establishments in Washington (state)